Tommaso Maestrelli (7 October 1922 – 2 December 1976) was an Italian footballer and manager, who played as a midfielder. He was well known for leading Lazio to their first Serie A title during the 1973–74 season. He also played for Italy at the 1948 Summer Olympics.

Honours

Managerial honours
Lazio
Serie A (1): 1973–74

Reggina
Serie C (1): 1964–65

Individual honours
Seminatore d'oro (2): 1968–69 (with Foggia), 1973–74 (with Lazio)

References

External links
Tommaso Maestrelli at Retestadio 

1922 births
1976 deaths
Italian footballers
Italy international footballers
Serie A players
Serie B players
S.S.C. Bari players
A.S. Roma players
S.S.D. Lucchese 1905 players
Italian football managers
Reggina 1914 managers
Calcio Foggia 1920 managers
S.S. Lazio managers
Footballers at the 1948 Summer Olympics
Association football midfielders
Olympic footballers of Italy
Burials at the Cimitero Flaminio